David Cooper (born 15 October 1976) is an Australian former professional basketball player who played the majority of his career in the Australian National Basketball League (ANBL). He also played in the New Zealand NBL and the South Australian State League.

Playing career
Born in Toowoomba, Queensland, Cooper began his ANBL career in 2000 with the Brisbane Bullets. After two seasons playing for the Bullets, he joined the Victoria Giants for the 2002–03 NBL season. Following the 2002–03 season, Cooper moved to New Zealand where he joined the Manawatu Jets for the 2003 New Zealand NBL season. He went on to earn league MVP honours that year, while also garnering Most Outstanding Forward and All-Star Five honours.

For the 2003–04 NBL season, Cooper joined the Cairns Taipans. In 35 games for the Taipans, he averaged 5.5 points, 4.1 rebounds and 1.0 blocks per game. He re-joined the Manawatu Jets for the 2004 New Zealand NBL season and won the Garry Pettis Memorial Trophy for leading the league in rebounding.

For the 2004–05 NBL season, Cooper joined the Adelaide 36ers, the team he continued to play for until 2010 when he retired from the league following the 2009–10 NBL season. In 293 ANBL games over 10 seasons, he averaged 5.2 points, 4.9 rebounds, 1.0 assists and 1.1 blocks per game.

Cooper also played two more years in the New Zealand NBL (2005 with Manawatu, and 2009 with the Hawke's Bay Hawks), and spent six years playing in the South Australian State League for the Norwood Flames between 2006 and 2011.

Coaching career
In 2012, Cooper became an assistant coach for the Norwood Flames. He became head coach the following year, winning Central ABL Coach of the Year honours in 2014.

References

External links
ANBL player profile

1976 births
Living people
Adelaide 36ers players
Australian men's basketball players
Brisbane Bullets players
Cairns Taipans players
Centers (basketball)
Hawke's Bay Hawks players
Manawatu Jets players
Power forwards (basketball)
Victoria Giants players
Sportspeople from Toowoomba